Era Aviation was a fixed wing airline as well as a commercial helicopter operation based in Anchorage, Alaska, United States. It operated a network of scheduled fixed wing passenger services from Anchorage as well as from Bethel, AK on behalf of Alaska Airlines via a code sharing agreement. Its main base was located at the Ted Stevens Anchorage International Airport (ANC). Era Aviation has since been renamed Corvus Airlines who currently do business as Ravn Alaska.  The company slogan was FlySmart. FlyEra.

History
Era Aviation was established and initiated operations in 1948 when Carl Brady flew the first commercial helicopter to Alaska for contract work supporting a mapping project for the U.S. government. Fixed wing aircraft were then acquired by the company in addition to helicopters with rotorcraft being operated in Alaska, California and Louisiana by the Era Helicopters division. In 1967, Houston-based Rowan Companies, purchased the company from founder Carl Brady. Scheduled fixed wing passenger services began in May 1983. During the summer of 1984, Era was operating scheduled services between Anchorage and Bethel, Kenai and Valdez. The airline formerly operated Convair 580 turboprops as well as de Havilland Canada DHC-6 Twin Otter and DHC-7 Dash 7 aircraft and then added DHC-8 Dash 8 turboprops. Most of the airline's scheduled passenger flights were code share feeder services for Alaska Airlines. Era used the two-letter "AS" airline code for its flight numbers on these services for Alaska Airlines. Beechcraft 1900C and Beechcraft 1900D turboprops were subsequently added to the fleet.

In late 2004, Rowan Companies sold Era Aviation (including the Era Helicopters division which subsequently merged with the Bristow Group, a large, U.S.-based international and domestic commercial helicopter operator, in 2020) to SEACOR Marine (now SEACOR Holdings).  Rowan had owned Era Aviation including the Era Helicopters division since 1967 before selling Era to SEACOR. SEACOR in turn had acquired Houston-based Tex-Air Helicopters in 2002 and then merged Tex-Air into Era Helicopters in 2004.  SEACOR subsequently sold the Era Aviation fixed wing operation, but retained Era Helicopters. The new owners of the Era Aviation fixed wing operation then filed for Chapter 11 bankruptcy.

Effective February 27, 2009, Era Aviation, Inc. was bought out and became a subsidiary of The Frontier Alaska Group along with Frontier Flying Service and Hageland Aviation. The combination of the three air carriers resulted in the largest Alaska-based airline in terms of serving more destinations and passengers operated with the largest airplane fleet in the state. The three airlines then operated under the marketing name of Era Alaska/Frontier Alaska (Hagland Aviation and Frontier Flying Services) which has since changed the marketing name of all the airlines to Ravn Alaska/Ravn Connect brands.

Destinations
Era Aviation operated scheduled passenger services to the following destinations in Alaska and Canada at various times over the years prior to the merger which created Era Alaska.

Most flights were operated from its hub located at the Ted Stevens International Airport (ANC) in Anchorage:

 Aniak, Alaska
 Barrow, Alaska (via an intermediate stop in Fairbanks)
 Bethel, Alaska (hub for village service flights)
 Cordova, Alaska
 Deadhorse, Alaska (Prudhoe Bay, Alaska)
 Fairbanks, Alaska
 Galena, Alaska
 Homer, Alaska
 Iliamna, Alaska
 Kenai, Alaska
 Kodiak, Alaska
 St. Mary's, Alaska
 Unalakleet, Alaska
 Valdez, Alaska
 Whitehorse, Yukon, Canada - only international route flown by Era

In addition, Ravn Alaska offers scheduled service to more than 100 communities statewide.

Fleet

The Corvus fleet included the following aircraft (upon merger):

 3 Beechcraft 1900D
 10 Bombardier Dash 8 Q100

Era Aviation previously operated Convair 580 turboprop aircraft as well as de Havilland Canada DHC-6 Twin Otter and DHC-7 Dash 7 turboprop aircraft. The Twin Otter and Dash 7 are short takeoff and landing (STOL) aircraft. The company also operated a Lear 35 business jet; however, this aircraft was not used in scheduled passenger airline operations. A flight seeing air tour service with Douglas DC-3 aircraft was also operated from Anchorage as Era Classic Airlines.

Buyout, divestiture and bankruptcy
Era Aviation was owned by Rowan Companies from 1967 until late 2004. On Jan. 4, 2005, Rowan announced the sale of Era to SEACOR Marine (now SEACOR Holdings) effective on Dec. 30, 2004 for $118.1 million in cash. Six months later, ownership of Era Aviation changed hands again with SEACOR retaining ownership of Era Helicopters, formerly a division of Era Aviation.  Era Helicopters then merged with the Bristow Group, a large commercial helicopter operator, in 2020.  Approximately six months later, the new ownership of Era Aviation filed for Chapter 11 bankruptcy in late 2005. In 2009 the company was acquired by rival Frontier Alaska Group with the Frontier Flying Service Part 121 mainline operation being engaged in the process of being merged into Era Aviation's operating certificate. In 2010, Era Alaska was formed using the assets of Frontier Alaska Group, Frontier Flying Service, Era Aviation, and Hageland Aviation. In 2014, Era's parent company changed its name to Corvus Airlines d/b/a Ravn Alaska.

See also 
 List of defunct airlines of the United States

References

External links
 flyravn.com

1948 establishments in Alaska
2009 disestablishments in Alaska
Airlines disestablished in 2009
Airlines established in 1948
Airlines based in Alaska
Cargo airlines
Companies based in Anchorage, Alaska
Defunct companies based in Alaska
Defunct regional airlines of the United States
Regional Airline Association members
American companies established in 1948
Defunct airlines of the United States